The 2012–13 season was Ulster's 19th season since the advent of professionalism in rugby union, and their first under head coach Mark Anscombe, replacing Brian McLaughlin who failed to get his contract re-signed. They competed in the Pro12 and the European Rugby Champions Cup.

Major signings included number eight Nick Williams from the now defunct Aironi, wing Tommy Bowe returning from his four-year stay at the Ospreys, and flanker Roger Wilson returning after four years with Northampton Saints. Hooker Rob Herring joined from Western Province.

Centre Nevin Spence died, along with his brother Graham and father Noel, in an accident at the family farm in Hillsborough, County Down on 15 September 2012. where they were overcome by fumes in a slurry tank. Spence's sister was treated in hospital and survived the accident. As a mark of respect for Spence, a minute's silence was observed at many rugby games in Britain and Ireland the following week. A memorial service was held at Ravenhill Stadium, the home ground of Ulster Rugby, on Sunday 23 September 2012.

Ulster started the season with 13 consecutive wins in all competitions, the longest unbeaten run in their history. They finished top of the table of the Pro12 with 17 wins, and after beating Welsh side Scarlets in the semi-finals 28–17, it was an-all Ireland final between Ulster and Leinster. Leinster were the eventual champions, defeating Anscombe's side 24–18. Scrum-half Ruan Pienaar was the leagues second-top scorer with 172 points. Ulster won the Fair Play Award, and Nick Williams was Players' Player of the Year. Williams and centre Luke Marshall made the Pro12 Dream Team. Andrew Trimble's try against Connacht was Try of the Season. They topped their pool in the Champions Cup with five wins out of six, qualifying for the quarter-finals, where they lost 27-16 to Saracens.

Ruan Pienaar was Ulster's top scorer with 205 points. Andrew Trimble was top try scorer with twelve, and was named Ulster's Player of the Year. Nick Williams was IRUPA Players' Player of the Year, and Craig Gilroy won the IRUPA Try of the Year award.

Staff

Squad

Senior squad

Players in (Season 2012/2013)
 Tommy Bowe from Ospreys
 Roger Wilson from Northampton
 Niall O'Connor from Connacht Rugby
 Rob Herring from Western Province
 Michael Heaney from Doncaster Knights
 Sean Doyle from Southern Districts
 Nick Williams from Aironi

Players out (Season 2012/2013)
 Conor Gaston to London Irish
 Ian Whitten to Exeter Chiefs
 Willie Faloon to Connacht Rugby
 Pedrie Wannenburg to Castres
 Andi Kyriacou to Cardiff Blues
 Ian Humphreys to London Irish
 Tim Barker to Rainey Old Boys
 Simon Danielli Retiring
 Stefan Terblanche Retiring
 James McKinney to Rotherham
 Jerry Cronin to Doncaster Knights
 Nevin Spence Deceased

Academy squad

Heineken Cup

Pool 4

Quarter–final

Pro12

Semi-final

Final

The final was contested on Saturday, 25 May 2013, between the winners of the two semi-finals.

End-of-season awards

2012–2013 Dream Team

Ulster Ravens

British and Irish Cup

Pool 1

 Match postponed from 19 January 2013 as Ulster were unable to fly due to the bad weather.  Despite this match being a dead rubber (the outcome of this game will have no bearing on qualification for the knockout stages nor on the ranking of the qualifiers), the match was rearranged as Bridgend would lose revenue otherwise.

Home attendance

Ulster Rugby Awards
The Ulster Rugby Awards ceremony was held on 10 May 2013. Winners were:

Bank of Ireland Ulster Player of the Year: Andrew Trimble
Heineken Ulster Rugby Personality of the Year: Nevin Spence
BT Sports Young Player of the Year: Iain Henderson
Ulster Rugby Supporters Club Player of the Year: Andrew Trimble
Abbey Insurance Academy Player of the Year: Stuart Olding
Belfast Telegraph Most Improved Player of the Year: Robbie Diack
Danske Bank Ulster Schools Player of the Year: Jack Owens, Campbell College

References

2012-13
2012–13 in Irish rugby union
2012–13 Pro12 by team
2012–13 Heineken Cup by team